The Shinkai (しんかい) is a crewed research submersible that can dive up to a depth of 600 m. It was completed in 1970, and until 1981 it had the greatest depth range of any crewed research vehicle in Japan. The Shinkai is owned and run by the Japan Coast Guard and it is launched from the support vessel Otomemaru (乙女丸).

Pilots and observers are housed in the forward hull with mechanical and power supplies in aft hull. A  escape sphere was mounted on the forward hull. Access was through four  hatches with one  emergency escape hatch. Five view ports with 90° viewing angle in the forward sphere, three  inside diameter for forward viewing and one  inside diameter on each side.

See also

References

External links

 HU-06 SHINKAI page

Deep-submergence vehicles
Research submarines of Japan
1970 ships